

Hermann Recknagel (18 July 1892 – 23 January 1945) was a German general during World War II and recipient of the Knight's Cross of the Iron Cross with Oak Leaves and Swords of Nazi Germany. Recknagel was shot and killed by Polish partisans on 23 January 1945 in German-occupied Poland.

Awards
 Iron Cross (1914)  2nd Class (1 October 1914) & 1st Class (30 September 1916)
 Clasp to the Iron Cross (1939) 2nd Class (22 September 1939) & 1st Class (2 October 1939)
 German Cross in Gold on 11 February 1943 as Generalmajor and commander of the 111. Infanterie-Division
 Knight's Cross of the Iron Cross with Oak Leaves and Swords
 Knight's Cross on 5 August 1940 as Oberst and commander of Infanterie-Regiment 54
 Oak Leaves on 6 November 1943 as Generalleutnant and commander of the 111. Infanterie-Division
 Swords on 23 October 1944 as General der Infanterie and commanding general of the XXXXII. Armeekorps

References

Citations

Bibliography

 
 
 

1892 births
1945 deaths
People from Hofgeismar
German Army generals of World War II
Generals of Infantry (Wehrmacht)
German Army personnel of World War I
Recipients of the clasp to the Iron Cross, 1st class
Recipients of the Gold German Cross
Recipients of the Knight's Cross of the Iron Cross with Oak Leaves and Swords
German Army personnel killed in World War II
People from Hesse-Nassau
Reichswehr personnel
20th-century Freikorps personnel
Military personnel from Hesse